Marcia Jean Hafif (née Woods; August 15, 1929 – April 17, 2018) was an American painter born in Pomona, California. 

Her work has been associated with the Radical Painting Group, an artist collective focused on abstraction and active during the 1970s and 1980s, which she formed together with Joseph Marioni, Olivier Mosset, and Erik Saxon.

Life and career
Hafif was born on August 15, 1929 in Pomona, California. After graduating from Pomona College in 1951, Hafif married and worked as a third-grade teacher. In the late 50s, she divorced her husband and began doing graduate work in Italian Renaissance and Far Eastern Art at Claremont Graduate School. In the summer of 1960, Hafif took a class with Richards Ruben, through whom she met Walter Hopps and various artists showing at Ferus Gallery in Los Angeles. 

In 1961 Hafif traveled to Italy, planning to spend a year in Florence. Passing through Rome, Hafif was drawn to the atmosphere of the city, remaining there for almost eight years. 

Returning to California in 1969, Hafif entered the first MFA class at the University of California at Irvine. She temporarily left painting to experiment in photography, film, sound, text, and installation. In 1970 Hafif began working on Notes on Bob and Nancy (1970-1977), an hour-long film featuring fellow UCI graduate students Nancy Buchanan and Robert Walker. Hafif's MFA thesis exhibition, U.C.I. Gallery, Irvine, CA 1971 (1971) featured 12 black and white photographs that depicted details of the gallery space in which they were displayed. This exhibition revealed an interest in "doing something that refers back to itself."

In 1971, Hafif moved to New York City to search out a return to painting at a time when the validity of painting was in doubt. She awoke on the morning of January 1, 1972, to make her first pencil on paper drawing. Starting in the upper left corner, Hafif covered the page across and down with short vertical marks. As she shifted back into painting, Hafif continued in this mode, methodically covering her canvases with short vertical marks of paint. Over the course of one year, Hafif developed a painting series that transitioned from white to black. An Extended Gray Scale (1972–73) came to encompass 106 oil paintings, each 22 x 22 inches. Each canvas was painted in a different tone of gray, determined by Hafif's ability to visually distinguish a difference in tone to the canvas preceding it.

Exhibiting for more than eight years with Sonnabend Gallery in Soho and Paris, she developed series of paintings that would become the basis of what came to be called The Inventory: 1974, Mass Tone Paintings; 1975, Wall Paintings; 1976, Pencil Drawings; 1978, Neutral Mix Paintings; 1979, Broken Color Paintings at The Clocktower with Alanna Heiss; 1981, Black Paintings. During this time she also published articles on painting in Artforum: “Beginning Again” in 1978, and in Art in America: “Getting on With Painting,” 1981, and “True Colors,” in 1989.

In the 1980s and 1990s, she developed new series, along with relationships with galleries in Europe, first in Munich, then Düsseldorf, and eventually Vienna, London, Paris, and elsewhere. Living part-time in California after 1999 still other series of paintings have appeared, most recently the Shade Paintings. 

Hafif died on April 17, 2018 at the age of 88.

Exhibitions 
2018
"Marcia Hafif: A Place Apart", Pomona College Museum of Art, September 4 - December 22, 2018
"Marcia Hafif: Films (1970–1999)", Städtische Galerie im Lenbachhaus und Kunstbau, Munich, July 17- September 30, 2018

2010 - "From the Inventory: Black Paintings, 1979-1980", Newman Popiashvili Gallery
2012 - "Marcia Hafif: From the Inventory – Late Roman Paintings", Larry Becker Contemporary Art, May 5 – July 7, 2012
2015 - "Marcia Hafif: From the Inventory", Laguna Art Museum, June 28 – September 27, 2015
 1969 - "Marcia Hafif. New Paintings", Roma, Galleria Editalia Qui arte contemporanea.

Collections
Hafif's work is held in collections worldwide including The Museum of Modern Art, New York.

References

1929 births
2018 deaths
People from Pomona, California
American women painters
20th-century American women artists
20th-century American painters
21st-century American women artists
21st-century American painters
Painters from California
Pomona College alumni
University of California, Irvine alumni